Stefan Maierhofer (born 16 August 1982) is an Austrian professional footballer who plays as a striker. Currently a free agent, he last played for Würzburger Kickers. Between 2008 and 2011, he made 19 appearances for the Austria national team, scoring one goal.

Maierhofer failed to make the grade with German giants Bayern Munich, making just two first team appearances. After spells with second division teams TuS Koblenz and Greuther Fürth he returned to his homeland with Rapid Wien. He enjoyed the best goalscoring form of his career here, which earned him a move to English Premier League club Wolverhampton Wanderers in 2009, where he made just ten appearances before returning to Austria.

Club career
Maierhofer was initially trained as a restaurant specialist/cook. In two seasons with Bayern Munich's reserve team, he scored 21 goals in 42 Regionalliga appearances and was the team's top goalscorer in both seasons.

In January 2007, Maierhofer moved to 2. Bundesliga side TuS Koblenz until the end of the season, scoring three goals in 14 league appearances. In July 2007, he signed a two-year contract with another team in the division, SpVgg Greuther Fürth, but the club sent him on a six-month loan to Austrian Bundesliga's Rapid Wien in January 2008.

He helped Rapid win the 2008 Bundesliga title, after scoring seven goals in 11 league matches for the club, including braces in a 2–0 derby win over Austria Wien and a 7–0 away win against the club's main title rivals Red Bull Salzburg. Consequently, Rapid decided to make the deal permanent and signed Maierhofer on a three-year contract.

The 2008–09 season saw his best goalscoring return as he struck 27 goals, including two in Champions League qualifiers, helping the club end the league campaign as runners-up.

He signed for newly promoted Premier League side Wolverhampton Wanderers in a three-year deal for an undisclosed fee – reportedly an initial £1.8m – on 31 August 2009. He scored on his debut in a 3–1 defeat at Blackburn Rovers. He suffered a hernia injury which put him out of action for several months, and upon regaining fitness was no longer in contention at Wolves. He was instead sent on a one-month loan to Championship club Bristol City in March 2010, but failed to make an impact.

During summer 2010, he was told he was no longer part of Wolves manager Mick McCarthy's plans and was instead loaned to 2. Bundesliga club MSV Duisburg on a season-long loan for the 2010–11 campaign. He scored 12 goals during the season, including a goal in a DFB Cup semi final to take the Zebras to the final where they lost to Schalke.

On 23 August 2011, Maierhofer returned to Austria when he signed for Red Bull Salzburg in a two-year deal. After a year and a half in Salzburg, Maierhofer returned to Germany, signing for 1. FC Köln in January 2013, but left in the summer. On 14 March 2014, Maierhofer joined Championship side Millwall on a short-term deal until the end of the 2013–14 season.

On 19 November 2014, he signed a short-term deal with SC Wiener Neustadt of the  Austrian Bundesliga for the rest of 2014. He was part of the starting XI against Wolfsberger AC three days later and scored the first goal in a 2–0 home win.

On 12 February 2016, he signed half-year contract with option to buy with FK AS Trenčín.

International career
Maierhofer's good performances during his initial loan spell at Rapid Wien secured him his first call-up to the Austrian national team in April 2008, when he was named to the country's preliminary squad for the UEFA Euro 2008 finals. However, he would not make the final cut.

On 20 August 2008, he eventually made his international debut, in a 2–2 friendly against Italy, in Nice. He scored his first international goal when he scored inside the first minute against the Faroe Islands on 5 September 2009.

Career statistics

Honours

Club
FC Bayern Munich II
IFA Shield: 2005

Rapid Wien
 Austrian Bundesliga: 2007–08

Red Bull Salzburg
 Austrian Bundesliga: 2011–12

AS Trenčín
 Slovak Super Liga: 2015–16
 Slovak Cup: 2015–16

References

External links
  
 
 
 

1982 births
Living people
People from Wien-Umgebung District
Austrian footballers
Austria international footballers
Bundesliga players
Austrian Football Bundesliga players
Austrian Regionalliga players
Premier League players
English Football League players
2. Bundesliga players
Regionalliga players
Slovak Super Liga players
Swiss Challenge League players
First Vienna FC players
FC Bayern Munich II players
FC Bayern Munich footballers
TuS Koblenz players
SpVgg Greuther Fürth players
SK Rapid Wien players
Wolverhampton Wanderers F.C. players
Bristol City F.C. players
MSV Duisburg players
FC Red Bull Salzburg players
Millwall F.C. players
SC Wiener Neustadt players
AS Trenčín players
FC Aarau players
SV Mattersburg players
FC Admira Wacker Mödling players
Würzburger Kickers players
Austrian expatriate footballers
Expatriate footballers in England
Expatriate footballers in Germany
Expatriate footballers in Slovakia
Expatriate footballers in Switzerland
Austrian expatriate sportspeople in England
Austrian expatriate sportspeople in Germany
Austrian expatriate sportspeople in Slovakia
Austrian expatriate sportspeople in Switzerland
Association football forwards
Footballers from Lower Austria